The Gaviota Tunnel (officially known as the Gaviota Gorge Tunnel) is a tunnel on U.S. Route 101 and California State Route 1 completed in 1953 in the center of Gaviota State Park,  northwest of Santa Barbara, California on the Gaviota Coast. Only the northbound lanes of US 101 pass through it, as the southbound lanes descend from Gaviota Pass through a narrow canyon to the west of the tunnel. Because it is the only major route between the Santa Barbara County South Coast and the Santa Ynez Valley, bicycles are allowed through it. There is a rest area for both southbound and northbound lanes on the southern end of the tunnel, the southernmost one along U.S. Route 101.

There are frequent rockslides in the area, especially during and following rain. Some of the hillsides and road cuts are covered in netting to prevent erosion. There are also fences made of netting along the roadway to stop rocks that do fall.

An alternate bypass to this section of US 101 between Santa Barbara and Los Olivos is provided by State Route 154 (SR 154) capped by the Cold Spring Canyon Arch Bridge near the summit of San Marcos Pass.

History 
Gaviota Pass is registered as California Historical Landmark #248. On this site during the Mexican–American War on Christmas Day 1846, the Mexican Army waited to ambush the US forces of John C. Frémont. Fremont learned of their plans and instead crossed the San Marcos Pass to capture Santa Barbara.

In popular culture 
The Gaviota Tunnel was featured in The Graduate, Wayne's World 2, and Sideways. But in the first film, Dustin Hoffman travels the wrong way through the tunnel. In the movie, they are supposed to be going southbound, but go through the tunnel in the northbound direction (the tunnel does not have any southbound lanes). In Wayne’s World 2 and Sideways, Mike Meyers and Paul Giamatti with Thomas Haden Church are all heading north, and therefore pass through the tunnel in the correct northbound direction.

The tunnel inspired in Grand Theft Auto V the fictional "Braddock Tunnel" that connects the town of Paleto Bay with the town of Grapeseed.

The tunnel is featured in American Truck Simulator.

California Historical Landmark

California Historical Landmark reads:
NO. 248 GAVIOTA PASS - Here, on Christmas Day, 1846, natives and soldiers from the Presidio of Santa Barbara lay in ambush for Lieutenant Colonel John C. Frémont, U.S.A., and his battalion. Frémont learned of the plot and, guided by Benjamin Foxen and his son William, came instead over the San Marcos Pass, to capture Santa Barbara without bloodshed.

See also 

 Gaviota Peak
 Gaviota, California
Santa Ynez Mountains
 Cold Spring Canyon Arch Bridge
 History of Santa Barbara, California
California Historical Landmarks in Santa Barbara County, California

References 

U.S. Route 101
Transportation buildings and structures in Santa Barbara County, California
Tunnels completed in 1953
1953 establishments in California
Santa Ynez Mountains
Road tunnels in California
Mountain passes of California